Hello Mrs. Cherrywinkle is a Canadian children's television program that aired from February 3, 1997 to 1999 on the Family Channel. It centered on the adventures of the title character, Mrs. Cherrywinkle (portrayed by Kathy "Babe" Robinson, of Philadelphia, PA), a stout woman full of energy who interacted with a variety of puppets in her home and garden.  The puppets used in the show were created by Noreen Young & Matt Ficner.

Songs for the series were written by Randy Vancourt and Tim Burns.

The show's format was adapted for the French network Télé-Québec from 1999 to 2003. American Public Television acquired the show in 1999 for U.S. distribution, with Time-Life Kids obtaining home video rights; Motion International planned to produce more episodes of the show for public television stations if it was successful; however, that would not happen.

Episodes

Series overview

References

1990s Canadian children's television series
2000s Canadian children's television series
1990s preschool education television series
2000s preschool education television series
1997 Canadian television series debuts
2003 Canadian television series endings
Canadian preschool education television series
Canadian television shows featuring puppetry
Family Channel (Canadian TV network) original programming